Divoká Orlice is a river in the Czech Republic and Poland. It separates the Bystrzyckie Mountains and Orlické Mountains. It is one of the main tributaries of the Orlice River, and is a part of Elbe river basin. It has its sources in Poland and then forms the border between Poland and the Czech Republic for 26 km. In Žďár nad Orlicí it joins with the Tichá Orlice to form the Orlice river. It is 99.3 km long.

Rivers of Poland
Rivers of Lower Silesian Voivodeship
Rivers of the Hradec Králové Region
Rivers of the Pardubice Region
International rivers of Europe
Czech Republic–Poland border
Border rivers